Peter Maclean Pollock (born 30 June 1941) is a retired South African cricketer. He has played a continuing role in the South Africa cricket team as a player and selector. He was voted a Wisden Cricketer of the Year in 1966. He was primarily a fast bowler, but was also a useful late-order batsman.

Family and personal life
Pollock is of Scottish ancestry through his father Andrew Pollock, who was born in Edinburgh to a minister and moved to present-day South Africa. Peter's brother, Graeme Pollock, an acclaimed left hand batsman, was a regular player for the South African cricket team at the same time as Peter, and two of his nephews also played first-class cricket, both for Transvaal and Leicestershire amongst other sides. Perhaps most famous of all is his son, Shaun Pollock, who played 108 Tests and over 300 ODIs for South Africa and is widely regarded as one of the finest all-rounders to ever play the game.

Peter attended Grey High School, a school famous for its sporting achievements, with his brother Graeme.

Career
On his debut, he took six wickets in the second innings against New Zealand in Durban in 1961. He was South Africa's leading bowler in the 1960s, playing every Test between 1962 and 1970.

Perhaps the highlight of his career came alongside that of his brother when they were both playing in a Test match at Trent Bridge in 1965. Peter took ten wickets in the match with innings figures of 5 for 53 and 5 for 34, while his brother Graeme, batting, made 125 and 59. South Africa won the match, and with it the three-Test series.
Peter and Graeme were leading figures involved in the famous Walk-off at Newlands in 1971 as a protest against apartheid and political interference in cricket.

Post-retirement
Pollock was convenor of selectors for South Africa in the 1990s, immediately following their re-admittance into world cricket after the collapse of apartheid. He is often credited with establishing the work ethic and style of play (based on tight fast bowling) that led to the team rapidly rising to become one of the top two teams in the game. Later, he led calls for the famous fast bowler Allan Donald to retire from the game when that player became very injury-prone due to his age. Pollock is an Honorary Life Member of the MCC.

Outside cricket, Peter was a journalist and company director and is now an international evangelist. He has written books on cricket and Christian belief.

See also
 List of South Africa cricketers who have taken five-wicket hauls on Test debut

References

Books
Bouncers and Boundaries (with Graeme Pollock) (1968)
The Thirty Tests (1978)
Clean Bowled (1985)
God's Fast Bowler (2001)
The Winning Factor (2004)
Into the Light  (2012)

External links
 

1941 births
Living people
Eastern Province cricketers
South African cricketers
South Africa Test cricketers
International Cavaliers cricketers
Wisden Cricketers of the Year
Cricketers who have taken five wickets on Test debut
South African people of Scottish descent
White South African people
Alumni of Grey High School